Acacia producta is a shrub of the genus Acacia and the subgenus Plurinerves that is endemic to northern central Australia.

Description
Like most species of Acacia it has phyllodes rather than true leaves. The evergreen phyllodes have an elliptic to narrowly oblanceolate shape and are straight or slightly curved.

Taxonomy
The species was first formally described by the botanist Mary Tindale in 1980 as a part of the work Notes on Australian taxa of Acacia as apublished in the journal Telopea. It was reclassified in 2003 by Leslie Pedley as Racosperma productum then returned to genus Acacia in 2006.

Distribution
It is native to the top end of the Northern Territory including Maria Island in the Gulf of Carpentaria where it is usually situated on rocky sandstone pavements on plateaux or alluvial flats where it is found growing in sandy or loamy or sandy-silty soils or over around laterite as a part of Eucalyptus woodland or in heathland communities.

See also
List of Acacia species

References

producta
Taxa named by Mary Tindale
Plants described in 1980
Flora of the Northern Territory